The 7th District of the Iowa House of Representatives in the state of Iowa.

Current elected officials
Henry Stone is the representative currently representing the district.

Past representatives
The district has previously been represented by:
 Kenneth L. Logemann, 1971–1973
 Robert A. Krause, 1973–1979
 Sue Mullins, 1979–1983
 Lester Menke, 1983–1985
 Thomas H. Miller, 1985–1993
 John M. Greig, 1993–1999
 Greg Stevens, 1999–2003
 Marcella Frevert, 2003–2011
 John Wittneben, 2011–2013
 Tedd Gassman, 2013–2021
 Henry Stone, 2021–present

References

007